The 1980 NAIA Soccer Championship was the 22nd annual tournament held by the NAIA to determine the national champion of men's college soccer among its members in the United States and Canada.

Three-time defending champions Quincy (IL) defeated Simon Fraser in the final, 1–0, to claim the Hawks' tenth NAIA national title.

The final was  again played at Sangamon State University in Springfield, Illinois.

Qualification

The tournament field remained fixed at ten teams. Two consolation games were eliminated, however, reducing the number of games from fifteen to thirteen.

Brackets

Championship

Consolation

See also  
 1980 NCAA Division I Soccer Tournament
 1980 NCAA Division II Soccer Championship
 1980 NCAA Division III Soccer Championship

References 

NAIA championships
NAIA
1980–81 NAIA championships
1980 in sports in Illinois